The Duralex Picardie is a classic design of a toughened glass tumbler found in cafes, schools and homes across France and in many places worldwide. It is manufactured by Duralex in La Chapelle-Saint-Mesmin in Loiret. The design has been produced in a range of sizes but they typically share markings on their bottoms with "MADE IN FRANCE" surrounding in circular design the name "DURALEX". According to Agence France-Presse, the glasses are "considered icons of modern design" and are sold in the Museum of Modern Art.

References

Drinking glasses
Drinkware
Teaware
French brands
French inventions